Mariah's Chapel is a historic United Methodist chapel located near Grandin, Caldwell County, North Carolina.  It was built in 1879, and is a simple frame church building.  It features a square belfry with a pyramidal roof and a needle spire.  Also on the property is the contributing church cemetery with approximately 100 graves.

It was listed on the National Register of Historic Places in 2004.

References

External links
 Waymarking text

United Methodist churches in North Carolina
Cemeteries on the National Register of Historic Places in North Carolina
Churches on the National Register of Historic Places in North Carolina
Chapels in the United States
Churches completed in 1879
19th-century Methodist church buildings in the United States
Buildings and structures in Caldwell County, North Carolina
National Register of Historic Places in Caldwell County, North Carolina